The Sukhoi Shkval (Russian Сухой Шквал, English Squall) was a Soviet project for an interceptor in the tail-sitter design.

History
In 1960, the young designer Rolan G. Martirossov (who later became chief designer) began his initiative with a team of 10 people, designing an aircraft of an entirely new class - a single-seater, highly capable Tail-sitter  for intercepting hunting. Soon the team got permission to work on the project in his spare time, and the project got the name Shkval-1 ([Squall-1). At the same time, Yakovlev worked at the Yak-36 and Hawker Siddeley at the Harrier. Both designs were equipped with a conventional Landing gear. The Shkval, however, such as the Lockheed XFV-1, should land on the stern and start on it and therefore require only a tiny space. After the concept was drawn up and wind tunnel tests were made in the TsAGI, the team of Pavel Sukhoi received the official confirmation for this project. This enabled funding by the state authorities and access to various experimental facilities. A partial mockup was built. In August 1963, the Ministry of Aircraft Engineering carried out a project assessment. There were heated discussions during the meeting in which the project group could not answer all the Commission's questions; Therefore, the achievements of the design team were recognized, but the financing for the construction of a prototype was denied. Another reason was the military doctrine based on the views of the new Soviet head of government, Nikita Khrushchev, to increasingly rely on rockets as attack and defence weapons and to reduce expenditures significantly on military aircraft construction.

Design and development
The Sukhoi Shkval was designed as a two-engined interceptor with radar, two built-in aircraft guns and side-by-side afterburner engines. Two designs were investigated in the wind tunnel. These differed only in the form of the air intakes and the position of the canards. The first version with D-shaped air intakes, comparable to the Su-15, and canards in front of the cockpit, which extend to the radome, could not get through. The second concept with rectangular ramp air inlets (comparable to the air inlets of the MiG-25) and canards at the upper side edge of the air inlets got the advantage. The hull itself is similar to the fuselage of the Su-15 without landing gear, wing, fin and brake flaps. The four wings were fixed at the corners of the fuselage as a reclining X (comparable to the fictional X-wing fighter from Star Wars). On the four wings end were cylindrical containers, which contained shock absorbers for take-off and landing in the lower part. The remaining part of these cylindrical containers were kerosene tanks, as in wings and the fuselage. The containers were externally provided with a guide plate to continue the wing. Each wing has a rudder that functions as a rudder and aileron. In order to facilitate the vertical landing, the entire Ejection seat as well as the Thrust lever and the Side-stick were pivotally mounted in the cockpit in such a way that the ratio of the ejection seat to these control elements remained unchanged regardless of the pivoting position. The swivel device gave the pilot a better view of the ground/landing zone by a window on the cockpit floor. A cockpit section of the Sukhoi Shkval was built with the window in the ground and the swivel seat/instrument combination, with which this function could be tested and demonstrated, which happened several times. A two-axle trailer was also planned for the transport and erection of the Sukhoi Shkval.

See also
Convair XFY Pogo
Lockheed XFV
Rockwell XFV-12
Heinkel Lerche
Ryan X-13 Vertijet
Focke-Wulf Triebflügel

References
Yefim Gordon, Sergey Komissarov Unflown Wings Soviet/Russian unrealised aircraft projects 1925–2010 Ian Allan Publishing   Pages 444–446
Yefim Gordon, Sergey Komissarov OKB Sukhoi A History of the Design Bureau and its Aircraft Ian Allan Publishing    Pages 515–518
Tony Buttler, Yefim Gordon Soviet Secret Projects Fighters Since 1945

External links
Image with wind tunnel models of the two layouts 
Plastic model  Suchoi Sukhoi Shkval
Two-sided view
Drawing Shkval in horizontal flight 
Drawing Shkval  hovering

Sukhoi Shkval
Abandoned military aircraft projects of the Soviet Union
Twinjets
Tailsitter aircraft